Michael Curtis "Yogi" Stewart (born April 24, 1975) is a retired French-born American basketball player who last played for the Atlanta Hawks of the NBA.

Early life
Stewart, son of former Santa Clara standout and European pro Mike Stewart, was born in Cucq, Pas-de-Calais, France and starred at Kennedy High School in Sacramento, California, leading the Cougars to back-to-back city section titles in 1990 and 1991.

Stewart earned his nickname "Yogi" from his older brother for his childhood love of Yogi Bear cartoons.

College career
Stewart played four seasons at the University of California, Berkeley. He averaged 4.3 ppg and 4.7 rpg in 117 games and finished as the Bears' all-time leading shot-blocker (207). Stewart set a school record by blocking 59 shots as a freshman in 1993–94 and holds the four best single-season totals for blocks in school history. He never missed a game, playing in all 117 games during his collegiate career and shooting .510 from the field.

At the 1994 U.S. Olympic Festival, Stewart was a member of the bronze medal-winning West team.

NBA career
Stewart went undrafted in the 1997 NBA draft, but  was signed to a one-year contract by the Sacramento Kings on September 11, 1997. This was a dream come true for Stewart, as he had served as a ball boy for the Kings in his youth. As a rookie in 1997–98, he led the Kings in blocked shots and ranked second overall among NBA rookies. He also blocked nine shots in one game. On January 21, 1999, Stewart was signed as a free agent by the Toronto Raptors. During the ensuing offseason, he was re-signed to a six-year, $24 million contract by the team.

In 2002, Stewart was traded from the Raptors (along with a future first round pick) to the Cleveland Cavaliers in exchange for Lamond Murray.

NBA career statistics

Regular season

|-
| style="text-align:left;"| 
| style="text-align:left;"| Sacramento
| 81||37||21.7||.480||–||.458||6.6||.8||.4||2.4||4.6
|-
| style="text-align:left;"| 
| style="text-align:left;"| Toronto
| 42||2||9.4||.415||–||.680||2.4||.1||.1||.7||1.5
|-
| style="text-align:left;"| 
| style="text-align:left;"| Toronto
| 42||1||9.3||.377||–||.563||2.2||.1||.1||.5||1.4
|-
| style="text-align:left;"| 
| style="text-align:left;"| Toronto
| 26||0||4.7||.324||–||.611||1.1||.1||.2||.1||1.3
|-
| style="text-align:left;"| 
| style="text-align:left;"| Toronto
| 11||0||8.5||.348||.–||.545||2.3||.3||.4||.3||2.0
|-
| style="text-align:left;"| 
| style="text-align:left;"| Cleveland
| 47||0||5.3||.378||–||.667||1.2||.1||.0||.3||.8
|-
| style="text-align:left;"| 
| style="text-align:left;"| Cleveland
| 8||2||9.5||.429||–||1.000||2.3||.0||.1||1.0||1.0
|-
| style="text-align:left;"| 
| style="text-align:left;"| Boston
| 17||0||4.2||.400||–||.500||.6||.0||.1||.1||.3
|-
| style="text-align:left;"| 
| style="text-align:left;"| Atlanta
| 12||1||12.1||.524||–||.429||3.3||.4||.5||.4||2.1
|- class="sortbottom"
| style="text-align:center;" colspan="2"| Career
| 286 || 43 || 11.5 || .442 || – || .522 || 3.2 || .3 || .2 || 1.0 || 2.2

Playoffs

|-
| style="text-align:left;"| 2001
| style="text-align:left;"| Toronto
| 2||0||2.0||.000||–||–||.5||.0||.0||.0||.0
|-
| style="text-align:left;"| 2002
| style="text-align:left;"| Toronto
| 1||0||8.0||1.000||–||–||3.0||.0||.0||1.0||4.0
|-
| style="text-align:left;"| 2004
| style="text-align:left;"| Boston
| 1||0||2.0||–||–||–||.0||.0||.0||.0||.0
|- class="sortbottom"
| style="text-align:center;" colspan="2"| Career
| 4||0||3.5||.667||–||–||1.0||.0||.0||.3||1.0

References

External links

1975 births
Living people
African-American basketball players
American expatriate basketball people in Canada
American men's basketball players
Atlanta Hawks players
Basketball players from California
Boston Celtics players
California Golden Bears men's basketball players
Cleveland Cavaliers players
French men's basketball players
National Basketball Association players from France
People from Cucq
Power forwards (basketball)
Sacramento Kings players
Sportspeople from Pas-de-Calais
Toronto Raptors players
Undrafted National Basketball Association players
21st-century African-American sportspeople
20th-century African-American sportspeople